John Joseph Leibrecht (born August 8, 1930) is an American prelate of the Roman Catholic Church. He served as bishop of the Diocese of Springfield-Cape Girardeau in Missouri from 1984 to 2008.

Biography

Early life 
Leibrecht was born on August 8, 1930, in Overland, Missouri, to John and Ellen (née Begley) Leibrecht. His parents were of German and Irish descent; one brother became a priest. John attended the St. Louis Archdiocesan Latin School, excelling at basketball. He then studied at St. Louis Preparatory Seminary and Kenrick Seminary.

Priesthood 
Leibrecht was ordained to the priesthood for the Archdiocese of St. Louis by Archbishop Joseph Ritter on March 17, 1956.  After his ordination, Leibrecht served as associate pastor at St. Louis Cathedral Parish.  He furthered his studies at the Catholic University of America in Washington, D.C., where he earned a Doctor of Education degree in 1961. Leibrecht taught and served as principal at Rosati-Kain High School in St. Louis for 11 years, then served for nine years as superintendent of education for the Catholic schools. In 1981, he was appointed as pastor of Sacred Heart Parish in Florissant, Missouri.

Bishop of Springfield-Cape Girardeau 
On October 20, 1984, Leibrecht was appointed the fifth bishop of the Diocese of Springfield-Cape Girardeau by Pope John Paul II. Leibrecht received his episcopal consecration on December 12, 1984, from Archbishop John May, with Archbishop Bernard Law and Bishop Glennon Flavin serving as co-consecrators.

In addition to his duties as diocesan bishop, Leibrecht chaired the US Conference of Catholic Bishops (USCCB) Committee on Education (1986-1989) and the Ex Corde Ecclesiae Committee on U.S. Catholic Colleges and Universities (1991-2000). He was a board member of the Catholic Health Association from 1997 to 2003, and chairman of the board for the Center for Applied Research in the Apostolate at Georgetown University (CARA).

Upon reaching the mandatory retirement age of 75, Leibrecht submitted his letter of resignation as bishop of the Diocese of Springfield-Cape Girardeau to Pope Benedict XVI in August 2005. Pope Benedict accepted his resignation on January 24, 2008.

See also
 

 Catholic Church hierarchy
 Catholic Church in the United States
 Historical list of the Catholic bishops of the United States
 List of Catholic bishops of the United States
 Lists of patriarchs, archbishops, and bishops

References

External links

Roman Catholic Diocese of Springfield–Cape Girardeau Official Site

Episcopal succession

1930 births
Living people
People from St. Louis County, Missouri
Roman Catholic Archdiocese of St. Louis
American people of German descent
Kenrick–Glennon Seminary alumni
Catholic University of America alumni
Roman Catholic bishops of Springfield–Cape Girardeau
20th-century Roman Catholic bishops in the United States
21st-century Roman Catholic bishops in the United States